Patrick Pigneter (born 19 July 1987) is an Italian luger who has competed since 2007. A natural track luger, he won nine medals at the FIL World Luge Natural Track Championships with four golds (Men's singles: 2009, Men's doubles: 2009, Mixed team: 2009, 2011), two silvers (Men's doubles: 2011, Mixed team: 2007), and three bronzes (Men's singles: 2005, 2007, 2011).

Pigneter won six medals at the FIL European Luge Natural Track Championships with two golds (men's singles: 2010, men's doubles: 2010), two silvers (men's doubles: 2008, mixed team: 2010) and two bronzes (men's singles: 2006, 2008).

Pigneter's father, Raimund, competed in natural track luge from the late 1970s to the mid-1980s.

References
FIL-Luge profile
FIL-Luge.org October 6, 2008 article on the FIL World Luge Natural Track Championships 2009 featuring Raimund and Patrick Pigneter. - accessed October 7, 2008.
Natural track European Championships results 1970-2006.
Natural track World Championships results: 1979-2007

External links

 

1987 births
Living people
Italian lugers
Italian male lugers
People from Völs am Schlern
Sportspeople from Südtirol